Amaury (from the Old French Amalric) or Amauri  may refer to:

People

Surname
Philippe Amaury (1940–2006), French publishing tycoon

Given name
Amaury Duval (1760–1838), French writer
Amaury Duval (1808–1885), French painter
Amaury, Count of Valenciennes, 10th-century noble in Hainaut
Amaury de Montfort (disambiguation), several people, lords of Montfort and counts of Évreux
Amaury Filion (born 1981), Dominican basketball player
Amaury Guichon (born 1991), Swiss-French pastry chef
Amaury Gutiérrez (born 1963), Cuban singer and musician
 Amaury of Jerusalem (Amalric; 1136–1174), king of the Crusader state of Jerusalem
Amaury Nolasco (born 1970), Puerto Rican actor
Amaury Pasos (born 1935), Brazilian basketball player
Amaury Telemaco (born 1974), Dominican baseball player
Amaury Vassili (born 1989), French tenor
Sergio Amaury Ponce (born 1981), Mexican soccer player

Other
Montfort-l'Amaury, a French commune in Yvelines département, France
Éditions Philippe Amaury (EPA), also known as Groupe EPA or the Amaury Group, a French media group 
Amaury Sport Organisation (ASO), part of the French media group, Éditions Philippe Amaury

See also
 
 Amery (disambiguation)
 Amauri (disambiguation)